"Crazy Vibes" is a song performed by Belgian musician and songwriter Selah Sue from her self-titled debut album Selah Sue. It was released on 10 February 2011 as a digital download in Belgium.

Track listing

Credits and personnel
Lead vocals – Selah Sue
Producers – Farhot
Lyrics – Fetsum Sebhat, Farhad Samadzada, Sanne Putseys, Torsten Haas
Label: Because Music

Charts

Weekly charts

Year-end charts

Certifications

Release history

References

2011 singles
Selah Sue songs
2010 songs
Songs written by Selah Sue
Because Music singles